Robert Francis "Choc" Bignall (14 March 1922 – 11 August 2013), commonly referred to as Bob Bignall, was an Australian soccer player who was the Australia captain at the 1956 Olympic Games held in Melbourne, Australia. Bignall started his career in 1939 and played over 400 matches in NSW for Corrimal Rangers, Woonona, North Shore and South Coast United as a defender before going onto represent both NSW and national sides as captain in the 1950s. He was inducted to the Football Federation of Australia Hall of Fame in 1999.

Playing career 
Bignall played for North Shore in 1945, then the Corrimal Rangers from 1950 to 1953 and for South Coast United in 1960 and 1961. All clubs were part of the NSW Division 1. He was a small stature man that had lightning speed and tenacious will to win.

International career 
Bignall played 8 matches for the Australian national team between 1954 and 1956, and he was the 127th player to debut for his nation against New Zealand on 28 August 1954. He became the 16th captain of the national team against South Africa in Sydney on 24 September 1955. He was also the captain for both of the 1956 Summer Olympic games.

Later life and death
After retiring from soccer, Bignall became a greyhound trainer.

Bignall died 11 August 2013 at the age of 91.

References

External links
Obituary in  Goal Weekly
Obituary at Football South Coast

1922 births
2013 deaths
Australian soccer players
Australia international soccer players
Olympic soccer players of Australia
Footballers at the 1956 Summer Olympics
Association football fullbacks